Saitohin is a protein that in humans is encoded by the STH gene. This intronless gene encodes for 128 amino acids in an open reading frame. It is located in the human tau gene, in the intron between exons 9 and 10. Also, a single polymorphism of a nucleotide is seen through a change of glutamine residue 7(Q7R) to arginine. It is found to be susceptible to multiple degenerative diseases, however, the exact function of the gene is still unknown.

References

Further reading